Cecil James Granville MacKenzie (26 February 1889 – 7 December 1959, Ayr) was a Scottish international rugby union player, who played for  as a centre. He was capped once in 1921.

References
 player profile on scrum.com

1889 births
1959 deaths
Scottish rugby union players
Scotland international rugby union players
Rugby union players from Ayr
Rugby union forwards